Golden Eagle Airlines was a regional airline of north Western Australia with bases at Port Hedland, Derby and Broome. It flew charter flights to regional destinations.

Accidents 
 On 11 July 2012, a Golden Eagle Airlines Piper Seneca crashed shortly after takeoff from Broome Airport on its way to Port Hedland. The aircraft was located two kilometers south of Cable Beach. The pilot, who was the only person on board the aircraft, was killed.

See also
List of defunct airlines of Australia
 Aviation in Australia

References

External links
  (as of 9 April 2013)

Airlines of Western Australia
Kimberley (Western Australia)
Defunct airlines of Australia